The supreme intercostal vein (highest intercostal vein) is a paired vein that drains the first intercostal space on its corresponding side.
 
It usually drains into the brachiocephalic vein. Alternatively, it drains into the superior intercostal vein, or the vertebral vein of its corresponding side.

Clinical significance
This vein does not have valves, this is an important point when it comes to spread of cancerous secondaries.

Additional images

See also
 superior intercostal vein
 posterior intercostal vein
 azygos vein

References

Veins of the torso